Harvard Ambulance Service (HMS) is a volunteer municipal emergency medical service organization, providing emergency basic life support services to the town of Harvard, Massachusetts.

References

Ambulance services in the United States
Medical and health organizations based in Massachusetts